Sparkle City may refer to:

 Sparkle City, Ontario, a community of Augusta, Ontario
 Sparkle City (album), a 2010 album by David Ball